A. Reyrolle & Company was a British engineering firm based in Hebburn, Tyne and Wear in the North East of England. For many years the company was one of the largest employers on Tyneside.

History

He moved the business to Hebburn on Tyneside in 1901. At its peak it manufactured switchgear for power stations worldwide and employed 12,000 people.

The company had its own football team, which evolved into Hebburn Town F.C.

The company merged with C. A. Parsons and Company to form Reyrolle Parsons in 1968. In 1977 Reyrolle Parsons merged with Clarke Chapman to form Northern Engineering Industries plc, which was acquired by Rolls-Royce plc in 1989.

The business was acquired in 1998 by VA Technologie AG, which was acquired by the industrial conglomerate Siemens in 2005, reuniting the company with Parsons under the new owners.
Siemens support the Reyrolle installed base on a global basis, with Operations and Protection based at the remaining section of the original Reyrolle Works in Hebburn, although this constitutes only around 10 percent of the original site. The Major Projects division is based at a modern office building on the nearby Monkton Business Park.

The New Zealand division, Reyrolle Pacific, was sold by Siemens AG/VA Tech to a private individual in New Zealand. This included the switchgear factory in Petone, with a staff of about 100. Reyrolle Pacific Switchgear became RPS Switchgear and manufactures retrofit breakers for the original LMT switchgear, and vacuum breakers and panels for 11 kV substations.

References

Further reading

 Arcs, Sparks & Engineers: A Centenary History of A. Reyrolle & Co. Ltd. (1901–2001), Alan Wright (ed.), Reyrolle Heritage Trust Press, 2001, 
 The Reyrolle Story, Robert Owen, Write Good Books, 2007, 

Engineering companies of the United Kingdom
Electrical engineering companies of the United Kingdom
Defunct companies based in Tyne and Wear
Energy companies established in 1886
Companies disestablished in 1998
1886 establishments in England
1998 disestablishments in England